The Complete Book of Elves is a supplementary sourcebook published by TSR in 1993 for the 2nd edition of the Advanced Dungeons & Dragons fantasy role playing game.

Contents 
The Complete Book of Elves was created to give players a deeper understanding of the Elven race within the world of Advanced Dungeons and Dragons, from day-to-day life, culture, myth and religion too new abilities and spells.

Table of contents

Publication history 
In 1989, TSR published the three core rulebooks for the second edition of their popular role-playing game Dungeons & Dragons. The company immediately followed this with a long series of supplementary splatbooks outlining new powers and abilities for all races and classes. One of these was The Complete Elves Handbook, written by Colin McComb and published in 1993, with interior color illustrations by Brom, Larry Elmore, and John  & Laura Lankey, and black and white art by Terry Dykstra. It was originally advertised in TSR's 1992 Fall/Winter catalog as "a detailed look at the culture, society, habits, strengths, and weaknesses of the many nations of elves."

In Dragon Magazine The Complete book of Elves was mentioned throughout the series of magazines. Where a player Brian J. Van Court showed concern for the missing magical cards that could be implemented including such sources in a letter to the magazine. In Bruce A. Heard's piece Lord of the Skies touched based on that of the "winged-elves" which were adapted from the Avariel in The complete book of Elves and Dragons Magazines issue #51.

The Complete book of Elves was also asked about by the community in Dragon Magazine Sage Advice Asking a series of questions on the use of multiple actions to combine on that of quick-draw and double-arrow shot. As well further detail on the use of trick shots by one reader. While another reader enquired about the use of that of the huntsmen to be given a "smaller penalty" when tracking "other non-rangers" as there was a hole in the kit's description on what the reduction of the penalty was.

Thirty years after its publication, author Colin McComb admitted The Complete Book of Elves was "dreadful", and acknowledged the negative influence the book had on the 2nd edition of AD&D, apologizing for "making elves so incredibly powerful and unbalanced that all of our AD&D games were henceforth ruined until 3rd Edition D&D came to save us."

Reception
In Issue 10 of Australian Realms, Brad Smart found the descriptions of the various subraces "too short for my liking, providing little additional information over what is set out in the individual campaign source books." He also pointed out that "the vast majority of the information on elven life, society, attitudes, culture and legends is useful only to players in generic 'standard' AD&D campaigns [...] I found it useless for an elf in say a Dark Sun world." Smart found the color plates "a pleasure to look at" but found the black and white illustrations "very bland." He concluded, "Compared with the other handbooks, The Complete Book of Elves holds its own, but does not stand out, useful for elf players, and those who buy every release, but otherwise read someone else's."

In the March 1994 issue of Magia i Miecz, Maciel Kocuj reviewed the large number of "splatbooks" published by TSR, and found The Complete Book of Elves "very similar in content [to other 2nd Edition splatbooks]. In some places the material is weaker, in some place stronger, and it brings a lot of both curiosities and boring repetitions."

References 

Dungeons & Dragons sourcebooks
Role-playing game supplements introduced in 1993